Felipe Mattioni Rohde (born 15 October 1988), known as Mattioni, is a Brazilian professional footballer who plays as a right-back.

He also holds Italian citizenship, and spent most of his career with Espanyol, being hindered by several injuries.

Career

Grêmio
Born in Ijuí, Rio Grande do Sul, Mattioni joined Grêmio Foot-Ball Porto Alegrense in 2004, being promoted to the main squad three years later but failing to appear in the Série A in his first season. However, after performing well in the Campeonato Brasileiro Sub-20 and appearing in the Campeonato Gaúcho, he made his debut in the top division in a 2–0 home win against Clube Náutico Capibaribe.

On 15 January 2009, A.C. Milan in Italy acquired Mattioni on loan, with the Rossoneri having an option to buy the player at the end of the campaign. He played his first match in a 2–2 friendly draw to Rangers, but failed to make an impact due to leg injuries, his Serie A input consisting of two minutes in a 2–0 away victory over Calcio Catania on 3 May.

In June 2009, Milan announced the club would not exercise the buying option on Mattioni. On 26 August, RCD Mallorca signed him also on loan, from Associação Maga Esporte Clube company, with a pre-set price of about €2 million. During the season he battled for first-choice status with Josemi, scoring from 40 meters in a 4–1 home win against Atlético Madrid as the Balearic Islands team eventually finished fifth and qualified to the UEFA Europa League (later revoked).

Espanyol
In May 2010, Mallorca decided to sign Mattioni permanently for €2 million subject to the decision of the administrator of the club, which was undergoing severe financial difficulties. Finally the deal fell through, and he joined fellow La Liga side RCD Espanyol from Maga.

Early into his spell in Catalonia, Mattioni sustained a severe knee injury – left anterior cruciate ligament – going on to miss the entire 2010–11 campaign. Shortly after recovering he suffered the same injury in his right leg, being initially ruled out for another six months and eventually nearly two years.

Mattioni finally returned to action on 1 November 2012, appearing as a late substitute in a 1–3 away loss against Sevilla FC for the round of 32 in the Copa del Rey. His first league appearance came on 2 February of the following year, as he started and played the full 90 minutes in a 3–2 home defeat of Levante UD.

Everton
On 29 September 2015, Mattioni featured for Premier League club Everton's under-21 side, playing in a 3–1 win over Norwich City. A month later, he signed a contract until the end of the season but was immediately loaned out to Doncaster Rovers of League One. He made his debut for the latter on 7 November in the first round of the FA Cup, featuring the full 90 minutes of a 2–0 win over semi-professional Stalybridge Celtic at the Keepmoat Stadium.

Back to Brazil
On 7 February 2017, Boa Esporte Clube announced the signing of Mattioni until the end of the season. He was injured in his third Série B match, and did not regain his place in the team.

Mattioni joined Veranópolis Esporte Clube Recreativo e Cultural in October 2017, ahead of the upcoming edition of the Campeonato Gaúcho. The following April he agreed to a deal at Esporte Clube Juventude of the second division, scoring in a 1–1 away draw against Grêmio Esportivo Brasil as the campaign ended in relegation.

In December 2018, free agent Mattioni moved to Coritiba Foot Ball Club.

References

External links

Grêmio official profile 
Assocalciatori profile 

1988 births
Living people
People from Ijuí
Brazilian people of Italian descent
Brazilian footballers
Association football defenders
Campeonato Brasileiro Série A players
Campeonato Brasileiro Série B players
Grêmio Foot-Ball Porto Alegrense players
Boa Esporte Clube players
Veranópolis Esporte Clube Recreativo e Cultural players
Esporte Clube Juventude players
Coritiba Foot Ball Club players
Serie A players
A.C. Milan players
La Liga players
RCD Mallorca players
RCD Espanyol footballers
English Football League players
Everton F.C. players
Doncaster Rovers F.C. players
Esporte Clube Novo Hamburgo players
Esporte Clube São José players
Brazilian expatriate footballers
Expatriate footballers in Italy
Expatriate footballers in Spain
Expatriate footballers in England
Brazilian expatriate sportspeople in Italy
Brazilian expatriate sportspeople in Spain
Brazilian expatriate sportspeople in England
Sportspeople from Rio Grande do Sul